Adhisty Zara Sundari Kusumawardhani (born June 21, 2003), known professionally as Adhisty Zara and formerly Zara JKT48, is an Indonesian singer, performer, and actress.

She emerged as a member of the Indonesian-Japanese idol group JKT48 in 2016, under the name Zara JKT48, along with her elder sister, Hasyakyla Utami Kusumawardhani.

The second of four siblings, she is the third generation descendant of Indonesian religious vocal group Bimbo, whose members are brothers and sister; one of the personnel, Raden Darmawan Dajat Hardjakusumah  Acil, is her direct grandfather. She graduated from the group on December 4, 2019.

Career

2016–18: JKT48 and acting career 
Adhisty Zara entered the showbiz industry after being introduced as a part of JKT48's 5th generation on May 29, 2016, at the age of 13. According to Zara, a staff approached and offered her to try for the audition when she was eating ice cream in front of her school. After getting selected, she traveled between Bandung and Jakarta to balance her school and the group's activity, before relocating permanently to Jakarta along with her older sister, Hasyakyla, who also joined JKT48 and both were then home-schooled.

Zara is soon promoted as an official member of the group, listed as a member of JKT48's Team T on  December 1, 2016, which she centered and remained until her graduation in 2019. JKT48's 15th single "Luar Biasa" (released December 21, 2016) marked her first appearance in the group's single. She was selected again for the single "So Long!" and "Dirimu Melody" the following year. Zara started her acting career after being cast in July 2017 to portray Disa, the younger sister of the titular character in Dilan 1990. In January 2018, Zara was cast as Euis in the film Keluarga Cemara, a remake of the popular 90s soap opera.

On the double-single released by JKT48 in July 2018, "Everyday, Kachuusa/UZA", she received her first ever center position in the group's single, "Everyday, Kachuusa" as well as being chosen to perform "UZA" after an audition. Zara's selection as a center marked the group's first single to be centered by a member from JKT48's Team T. The story music video for "Everyday, Kachuusa" featured Zara, without any appearances from other selected members, and actor Abun Sungkar.

2019–2023: Breakthrough and rise to prominence 
After the release of Keluarga Cemara in January 2019, Zara won her first and second nomination at the 7th Maya Awards and 13th Indonesian Movie Actors Awards. The movie also became the country's ninth most-watched box-movie of the year. 

In February 2019, it was announced she's set to star in a new movie, Dua Garis Biru, in the leading role. Shortly after the trailer release, the film received public backlash, mainly from adults, who criticized the sex-education movie for “promoting free sex” to teenagers. However, the film was a box-office hit and received positive reviews, with critics praising both the acting and writing. It became the second most-watched Indonesian film of the year, driving Zara into large public recognition. Following the success of Keluarga Cemara, Visinema Pictures announced a sequel film and television series, with the latter focusing on Zara's character.

After being selected to appear on the AKB48 Group Asia Festival in Shanghai, Zara announced that she's leaving the group to focus on her acting career in August 2019. In late August 2019, Zara and other top-tier Indonesian actressed and actors had signed to appear in the planned Bumilangit Cinematic Universe as Virgo, with Zara set to have her own film Virgo and The Sparklings. In October 2019, she was cast as lead in the Wattpad-adapted film, Mariposa, and its upcoming spin-off film. After having her farewell concert in November 2019, she officially left JKT48 the following month. It was released in March 2020 to mixed reviews and gained over 500.000 audiences its one-week run due to the pandemic; it was re-released in early 2021.

Zara starred in lead role as Sharona in Vidio's television series I Hear(t) You, which premiered in December 2020. Production for Keluarga Cemara 2 began in late 2020 and wrapped in February 2021. In March 2021, she begins production for Before I Met You. The film is scheduled for a March 2022 release date, but was canceled due rising Covid-19 numbers and instead released on Prime Video in July 2022. 

Soon after wrapping the production for Before I Met You, Zara begins production for another Vidio original, Live with my Ketos, which wrapped on 6 June 2021. The previous day, she was cast as lead in Virgin the Series, a remake of early 2000s drama film. The series begins production in June and wrapped in September 2021, and premiered in January 2022 on Disney+ Hotstar. In October 2021, Disney+ Hotstar announced Keluarga Cemara the Series as one of its original production coming in 2022.

Production for Keluarga Cemara the Series begins in February 2022 and wrapped the following April. Zara reprised her role as Acha in the film 12 Cerita Glenn Anggara in April 2022. Keluarga Cemara 2 was released in June 2022, followed by Keluarga Cemara the Series in September 2022. Zara appeared as a surprise during the JKT48 10th Anniversary Concert in August 2022.

Discography

JKT48 singles

Others JKT48 singles
 JKT48 Circus
 "Gadis Gadis Remaja" / Team T

 JKT48 Circus Part 3
 "Teriakan Berlian" (Team T Ver.)

JKT48 Albums
 JKT48 Festival
 "JKT Festival"
 "Melon Juice" / Team T
 "Pintu Masa Depan"

 B•E•L•I•E•V•E
 "Waiting room" / JKT48 5th Generation

 JOY KICK! TEARS
 "Kereta Kedewasaan"
 "Kalender yang Dipercepat" / Team T

Outside JKT48 
Seperti Cemara (2019, for Keluarga Cemara)

Filmography

Film

Web series

Awards and nominations

References 

2003 births
Living people
Indonesian actresses
21st-century Indonesian women singers
Indonesian pop singers
Indonesian Muslims
JKT48 members
People from Bandung
Sundanese people
Indonesian child singers